Ian Hazel (born 1 December 1967) is an English former professional footballer who played as a midfielder.

Career
Hazel began his career as an apprentice with Wimbledon, turning professional in December 1985. He was never a regular with the Dons and moved to Bristol Rovers on loan in February 1989. He joined Rovers on a full contract in July 1989, leaving to join Maidstone United, after a brief spell at Gloucester City, on a non-contract basis in March 1992.

In the 1992 close season, he joined Slough Town, moving to Aylesbury United in August 1994. He moved to Carshalton Athletic in 1995 and to Chesham United in 1996.

In October 1998, Hazel joined Tooting & Mitcham United where he later became player-coach and then manager. He resigned as manager in November 2002. In February 2003 he became manager of Molesey. but left that June after saving the club from relegation.

In November 2003, while working full-time as a coach for Fulham, Hazel joined Banstead Athletic as a player, playing for the first time in three years. In December 2003 he took over as manager of Walton & Hersham, where he went on to have a 17 match unbeaten run.

He worked for the Fulham academy for 18 months until March 2006 when he took over as manager of Sutton United, from where he resigned in October 2007. Two weeks later he took over as manager of Leatherhead. Hazel resigned from first team manager at Leatherhead in 2008.

Hazel worked at Carshalton Athletic as the head of the club's youth academy set-up. He temporarily took charge of the first team on five occasions, the last being in September 2012 following the departure of Paul Dipre from the role.

Hazel later worked at Wimbledon as first team scout.

References

Living people
1967 births
English footballers
Wimbledon F.C. players
Bristol Rovers F.C. players
Maidstone United F.C. (1897) players
Slough Town F.C. players
Aylesbury United F.C. players
Carshalton Athletic F.C. players
Chesham United F.C. players
Tooting & Mitcham United F.C. players
Banstead Athletic F.C. players
Gloucester City A.F.C. players
Sutton United F.C. players
English Football League players
Tooting & Mitcham United F.C. managers
Molesey F.C. managers
Walton & Hersham F.C. managers
Sutton United F.C. managers
Leatherhead F.C. managers
Association football midfielders
English football managers